Saint Umar  College is a Boys & Girls UP Board & CBSE School located in Jhansi, Uttar Pradesh, India.

College history

"Saint Umar College" was founded by Mr. Hazi Wahid Ahmed Saql.

References

External links
School's Alumni website
School's Official website

Primary schools in Uttar Pradesh
High schools and secondary schools in Uttar Pradesh
Intermediate colleges in Uttar Pradesh
Education in Jhansi
Educational institutions established in 1999
1999 establishments in Uttar Pradesh